Tropodithietic acid is a tropolone derivative produced by the marine bacteria Phaeobacter piscinae, Phaeobacter inhibens and Phaeobacter gallaeciensis. Its structure is composed by a dithiete moiety fused to tropone-2-carboxylic acid.

References

Tropolones
Tropones
Organosulfur compounds
Aromatic compounds
Sulfur heterocycles
Disulfides
Carboxylic acids